Asali Santoshpur   is a village in Barisal District in the Barisal Division of southern-central Bangladesh.

References

External links
 Satellite map at Maplandia.com

Populated places in Barisal District